The canton of Aigueperse is an administrative division of the Puy-de-Dôme department, central France. Its borders were modified at the French canton reorganisation which came into effect in March 2015. Its seat is in Aigueperse.

It consists of the following communes:
 
Aigueperse
Artonne
Aubiat
Bussières-et-Pruns
Chappes
Chaptuzat
Chavaroux
Clerlande
Effiat
Ennezat
Entraigues
Lussat
Les Martres-d'Artière
Martres-sur-Morge
Montpensier
Saint-Agoulin
Saint-Genès-du-Retz
Saint-Ignat
Saint-Laure
Sardon
Surat
Thuret
Varennes-sur-Morge
Vensat

References

Cantons of Puy-de-Dôme